František Koželuh (1885–1946) was a Czech football player and manager.

Club career
Koželuh played most of his playing career in Prague with Sparta.

Coaching career
He started as assistant of John William Madden at Sparta Prague between 1905 and 1911. Then, he coached Sparta Prague in the 1911–12 season. Later, he moved abroad, to Yugoslavia, where he coached Croatian side HAŠK Zagreb between 1912 and 1915. Next he coached Polish side Wisla Krakow between 1929 and 1934.

Honours
HAŠK
Croatian championship: 1912

References

1880s births
1969 deaths
Footballers from Prague
AC Sparta Prague managers
AC Sparta Prague players
Czech football managers
Czechoslovak football managers
Czech footballers
Czechoslovak footballers
Expatriate football managers in Poland
Expatriate football managers in Yugoslavia
HAŠK managers
Wisła Kraków managers
Association footballers not categorized by position